The Corvus Fusion is a two-seat, low wing, light sport aircraft produced by Corvus Hungary LLC in Italy.

Design and development
The Corvus Fusion is an all composite aircraft offered either as a factory built aircraft or as a kit.  It was conceived by Andras Voloscsuk, Chief Executive Engineer, as "... an ultralight aircraft for enthusiasts who would love to try something similar that the Racer 540 can do."  It was announced in August 2011 and introduced 27 January 2012 in Pordenone, Italy.

The Corvus Fusion features an inverted oil system and a symmetrical airfoil, which allows it to fly equally well either upright or inverted.  It is available with either conventional landing gear or tricycle gear and with a ballistic parachute.

During a demo flight on 30 March 2012, a Corvus Fusion was flown through several aerobatic manoeuvres including loops and barrel rolls.

Specifications

References

External links

Single-engined tractor aircraft
Light-sport aircraft
Fusion